Dr. Kimani Njogu is Kenyan linguist known for his role in study and advocacy of Kiswahili language.

Life and career
Njogu was born in Kericho County. After teaching high school, he pursued further education in Swahili studies, gaining his bachelor's degree from Kenyatta University in 1985 and Masters from University of Nairobi. He joined the faculty of Kenyatta University. In 1988, he embarked on a scholarship at the department of Linguistics at Yale University, where he completed his PhD in 1993 with a dissertation on dialogue poetry in East Africa. On returning to Kenya, he once again served on the faculty at Kenyatta University before becoming an independent scholar. He is the founder chairman of Chama cha Kiswahili cha Taifa, a body dedicated to the promotion of Kiswahili in Kenya. His book, Ufundishaji wa Fasihi: Nadharia na Mbinu, coauthored with Rocha Chimera, won the 2000 Noma Award for Publishing in Africa. He has also written a widely used Kiswahili dictionary.

Njogu is the CEO of Twaweza Communications, a strategic communications firm. In 2012, he was among ten civil society activists given an award for promoting democracy, inclusion and equal opportunity by Ford Foundation to mark its fiftieth year in East Africa.

References

Year of birth missing (living people)
Living people
Linguists
Kenyatta University alumni
University of Nairobi alumni
Yale University alumni
Academic staff of Kenyatta University
Swahili-language writers
People from Kericho County